Sujangarh railway station is a railway station in Churu district, Rajasthan. Its code is SUJH. It serves Sujangarh  town. The station consists of a pair of platforms. Passenger, Express, and Superfast trains halt here.

Trains

The following trains halt at Sujangarh railway station in both directions:

 Bandra Terminus–Jammu Tawi Vivek Express
 Jodhpur–Delhi Sarai Rohilla Superfast Express
 Salasar Express
 Bhagat Ki Kothi–Kamakhya Express
 Bandra Terminus–Hisar Superfast Express

References

Railway stations in Churu district
Jodhpur railway division